Louis Agassiz Shaw Jr. (September 25, 1886 – August 27, 1940) was an instructor of physiology at the School of Public Health of Harvard University, where he is credited in 1928 along with Philip Drinker for inventing the Drinker respirator, the first widely used iron lung.

Family and early life 

Shaw's parents were Louis Agassiz Shaw Sr. and Mary Elizabeth Saltonstall. Both parents came from wealthy and politically influential Boston Brahmin families with roots extending back to the Mayflower. The couple's elder son was Quincy Adams Shaw III (born May 21, 1885). Louis Sr. died at home in Chestnut Hill from tuberculosis when Louis Jr. was only four years old on July 2, 1891.

Shaw's father was born at 26 Mount Vernon Street in Beacon Hill in 1861, and the following year the family moved to Jamaica Plain. He attended George Washington Copp Noble School in Boston, and graduated from Harvard University in 1884. He married Mary Elizabeth Saltonstall on June 30, 1884, in Newton, right after the graduation ceremony.

Shaw's uncle Robert Gould Shaw II was the first husband of Nancy Witcher Langhorne. She later married Waldorf Astor, the eldest son of William Waldorf Astor and Mary Dahlgren Paul of the Astor family.

Shaw's paternal grandparents were Quincy Adams Shaw (one of the richest men in Massachusetts through his investment in the Calumet and Hecla Mining Company) and Pauline Agassiz. Shaw's great grandfather, for whom he was named, was Louis Agassiz, noted professor of zoology at Harvard University. Another of Shaw's great grandfathers was Leverett Saltonstall I, a member of the United States House of Representatives.

Shaw married Joanne Bird of East Walpole on June 14, 1910. The couple had two children, Joanne Bird Shaw (born March 31, 1911) and Pauline Agassiz Shaw (November 4, 1915 — October 30, 1992).

Education 
Louis Jr. followed his father's educational footsteps, first attending the George Washington Copp Noble School (which had been renamed the Noble and Greenough School in 1892) and later attending Harvard University, graduating in 1909. Shaw's cousin Leverett Saltonstall also pursued the same academic path. Shaw continued to study for a couple of years after graduation, taking classes in botany, geology, and zoology. He contracted tuberculosis in the summer of 1911, and was consequently unable to work until the spring of 1913.

Career 

Beginning in 1914, his research focused exclusively on physiology. Shaw and his family moved into the brownstone building located at 6 Marlborough Street in the Back Bay in 1917, having acquired the property upon the death of his grandmother, Pauline Agassiz Shaw. The building had a long history, having served as a private day school (18851893), later as headquarters of the Massachusetts Woman Suffrage Association (19041915), and then as headquarters of the Women's Municipal League of Boston (19151917).

From late 1917 until early 1919, Shaw and his research team conducted investigations in his home laboratory on the physiological effects of poisonous gases and other problems related to the ongoing war in Europe. In the spring of 1919, he joined the faculty at the Harvard-MIT School for Health Officers in the department of industrial hygiene. The Harvard-MIT School for Health Officers was a joint venture between Harvard Medical School and Massachusetts Institute of Technology (MIT) that began in 1913. The joint venture ended in 1922, when the Harvard School of Public Health was formally established.

Shaw and his family continued to live at 6 Marlborough Street at least until 1927. Shaw was a member of the Tennis and Racquet Club, located on Boylston Street not far from his house. In that year, Shaw was arrested for the distillation of alcohol, which was illegal in the United States during Prohibition, in effect from 1920 to 1933. Shortly after that event, the house was demolished and replaced by a five-story, 21-unit apartment house.

Shaw was an instructor in physiology at the Harvard School of Public Health, where he is credited in 1928 along with Philip Drinker (1894–1972, associate professor of industrial hygiene) and his brother Cecil Kent Drinker (1887–1956, later dean of the Harvard School of Public Health) for inventing the first widely used iron lung. The machine was powered by an electric motor with air pumps from two vacuum cleaners. The air pumps changed the pressure inside a rectangular, airtight metal box, pulling air in and out of the lungs.

Publications

References 

American inventors
Harvard University staff
1886 births
1940 deaths
Louis
American people of English descent
American people of Swiss descent
Harvard University alumni
Noble and Greenough School alumni
People from Jamaica Plain
People from Beacon Hill, Boston